Central Tapanuli Regency (Tapanuli Tengah in Indonesia) is a regency in North Sumatra province, Sumatra, Indonesia. The seat of regency government is at Pandan. The regency covers an area of 2,194.98 km2 and it had a population of 311,232 at the 2010 census and 365,177 at the 2020 Census.

Administrative districts
The regency is divided into twenty districts (kecamatan), tabulated below with their areas and their populations at the 2010 Census  and the 2020 Census The table also includes the locations of the district administrative centres, the number of administrative villages (desa and kelurahan, 215 in total) in each district and its post code.

Note: (a) Includes Mursala Island and 18 smaller islands off the coast.

Tourist sites
Central Tapanuli's beaches are ideal for surfing, although they are not as well known as those of Nias Island. The regency has 30 offshore islands; one of the biggest is Mursala Island with 8,000 hectares (1 hour by motorboat from Sibolga), which has a waterfall that directly drops to the sea; around 100 metres from the waterfall the water still tastes plain and the corals are unique and beautiful. In 1933, the first King Kong film has taken pictures here.

References

Regencies of North Sumatra